Marie Elizabeth Howe is an American Democratic politician from Somerville, Massachusetts. She represented the 31st Middlesex district in the Massachusetts House of Representatives from 1965 to 1988.

See also
 1965-1966 Massachusetts legislature

References

Year of birth missing
Year of death missing
Members of the Massachusetts House of Representatives
Women state legislators in Massachusetts
20th-century American women politicians
20th-century American politicians
People from Somerville, Massachusetts